Muntinlupa, officially the City of Muntinlupa, is a 1st class highly urbanized city in the National Capital Region of the Philippines. According to the 2020 census, it has a population of 543,445 people.

It is classified as a highly urbanized city, it is bordered on the north by Taguig; to the northwest by Parañaque; by Las Piñas to the west; to the southwest by Dasmariñas; by San Pedro and Laguna de Bay to the east, the largest lake in the country. It is given the nickname "Emerald City" by the tourism establishment and also known as the "Gateway to Calabarzon" as it is the southernmost city of the National Capital Region.

Muntinlupa is known as the location of the national insular penitentiary, the New Bilibid Prison, where the country's most dangerous criminals are incarcerated, as well as the location of Ayala Alabang Village, one of the country's biggest and most expensive residential communities, where many of the wealthy and famous live.

Etymology
There are three plausible origins of the name of the city: First, is its association with the thin topsoil in the area; second, residents, purportedly replying to a question by Spaniards in the 16th century what the name of their place was, said “Monte sa Lupa”—apparently mistaking the question for what card game they were playing; third, the topographical nature of the area, where the term Monte or mountain was expanded to Muntinlupa or mountain land. Based on the 1987 Philippine constitution, it is spelled as Muntinglupa, instead of Muntinlupa.

History

Early history
 1601: Some 88 years after the arrival of Portuguese navigator Ferdinand Magellan in the Visayas islands, the original lands constituting Muntinlupa could be deduced to have been friar lands administered by the Augustinians, then sold and assigned to the Sanctuary of Guadalupe.
 1869: The lands were transferred to the state and large individual landholders. In an effort by the Spanish Government to bring under closer administrative control the people living in the contiguous sitios, as well as those in Alabang, Tunasan, Sucat, and Cupang, the municipality was created upon the recommendation of Don Eduardo de Canizares.
 August 6, 1898: The town supported the Philippine Revolution against the Spaniards and formally joined the revolutionary government headed by Gen. Emilio Aguinaldo.

20th century

 June 1, 1901: The Philippine Commission promulgated Rizal Province on June 11, 1901, through Act No. 137. Muntinlupa becomes part of the new province after being a part of the defunct province of Manila.
 October 12, 1903: Muntinlupa, alongside Taguig, were merged with Pateros by virtue of Act No. 942.
 November 25, 1903: Muntinlupa was incorporated under Act No. 1008 and included within the boundary of the province of La Laguna under the municipality of Biñan. Muntinlupa residents protested this Executive Act, and through their town head, Marcelo Fresnedi, filed a formal petition to the Governor for the return of the municipality to the province of Rizal.
 March 22, 1905: Act No. 1308 paved the way for Muntinlupa's return to Rizal province to become a part of Taguig, along with Pateros. However, it was eventually separated from Taguig due to its physical distance.
 January 1, 1918: Governor-General Francis Burton Harrison's Executive Order 108 dated December 19, 1917, which grants the petition of residents for an independent status of their municipality, takes effect. Vidal Joaquin, a native of Alabang, served as the first appointed mayor in 1918-1919 followed by Primo Ticman, native of Poblacion 1919-1922 while the first elected mayor was Melencio Espeleta (1922-1924).
 January 22, 1941: The historic New Bilibid Prison, the national penitentiary, was established in the hills of Muntinlupa.
 November 7, 1975: Muntinlupa was transferred from the Province of Rizal to the newly formed Metropolitan Manila by virtue of Presidential Decree No. 824 issued by then President Ferdinand E. Marcos.
 June 13, 1986: Following the EDSA Revolution in February that year, President Corazón C. Aquino appoints Ignacio R. Bunye, Officer-In-Charge of Muntinlupa as part of a nationwide revamp of local government units.  In the ratification of the 1987 Constitution, Muntinlupa together with Las Piñas formed one political district.
 December 6, 1988: President Corazon C. Aquino by Proclamation 351 declares December 19 as "Municipality of Muntinlupa Day".
 February 16, 1995: House Bill No. 14401 converting the Municipality of Muntinlupa into a highly urbanized city was approved by the House of Representatives.
 March 1, 1995: Muntinlupa became the 65th city in the Philippines as signed into law by President Fidel V. Ramos, its conversion into a highly urbanized city by virtue of Republic Act No. 7926. Per Section 62 of R.A. 7926 Muntinlupa and Las Piñas were to constitute separate congressional districts, with each district electing its separate representative in the 1998 elections. This separation was additionally confirmed in the city charter of Las Piñas (R.A. 8251) which was approved by plebiscite on March 26, 1997.
 June 30, 1998: Former mayor Ignacio Bunye assumed office as the first congressman representing the city.

21st century
 March 1, 2001: Republic Act No. 9191 declaring the 1st day of March of every year as a Special Non-working Holiday in the City of Muntinlupa to be known as "The Muntinlupa City Charter Day" by virtue of Senate Bill No. 2165.
 August 3, 2007: The city hall of Muntinlupa was completely damaged and later abandoned due to a fire. The fire started from a slum area behind the city hall. Almost all files, important documents and other references of Muntinlupa were burned.

Geography

Topography

It is bordered on the north by Taguig; to the northwest by Parañaque; by Las Piñas to the west; to the southwest by the city of Bacoor in Cavite; by the city of San Pedro, Laguna; and by Laguna de Bay to the east, the largest lake in the country.

Muntinlupa's terrain is relatively flat to sloping towards the east along the lake.

While majority of the land area in the city is highly urbanized, the NBP Reservation in barangay Poblacion is relatively free of urbanization but there are ongoing discussions to move the national penitentiary to Nueva Ecija.

Cityscape

Alabang is the business district of the city where the tallest structures in the city are located. It used to be the location of Alabang Stock Farm. Land reclamation is also done along the Laguna Lake for further developments in the city. During the dry season, the water level in the lake subsides, exposing the soil that is then used for farming.

Climate
The dry season rungs through the months of November to April, while the wet season starts in May and lasts to November. The wet season reaches its peak in the month of August. Maximum rainfall in Muntinlupa usually occurs from the month of June to September. The highest temperature occurs during the month of April and May (34 degrees Celsius) while the lowest occurs during the months of January & February (24 degrees Celsius).

Natural hazards
The west segment of the Marikina Valley Fault System, the West Valley Fault (WVF) cuts through parts of Muntinlupa and moves in a predominantly dextral strike-slip motion. The West Valley Fault is capable of producing large scale earthquakes on its active phases with a magnitude of 7 or higher.

Districts and barangays
Muntinlupa is composed of a lone congressional district, and two legislative districts which are politically subdivided into nine barangays. The 1st legislative district includes barangays Bayanan, Putatan, Poblacion and Tunasan in the southern half of the city, while the 2nd legislative district are barangays Alabang, Buli, Ayala Alabang, Cupang and Sucat in the northern portion of the city.

Other zip codes include Muntinlupa Central Post Office 1770, Ayala Alabang Village 1780, Pleasant Village 1777, Susana Heights 1774, and Filinvest City 1781.

Etymology of barangays
The barangays of the city is named after the botanical characteristics, topographical features, and historical events that had been observed in the area when it was named. Tunasan from the plant tunas. Putatan got its name from a tree called putat. Cupang is likewise named after the cupang tree. Buli is named after the buri palm. Alabang is named after the river that passes through the barangay. Ayala Alabang was created by Batas Pambansa Bilang 219 and was originally a part of Barangay Alabang. Sucat got its name from the vernacular word "sukat" which means “measurement” since during the Spanish era was always measured.

Subdivisions
While Barangays are the administrative divisions of the city, and are legally part of the addresses of establishments and homes, many residents indicate their Subdivision (village) instead of their Barangay.

Demographics

Demonym
People from Muntinlupa are referred to as Muntinlupeño as an adaptation from the standard Spanish suffix -(eñ/n)o.

Language
The native language of Muntinlupa is Tagalog, but the majority of the residents can understand and speak English.

Religion

People in Muntinlupa are mainly Roman Catholic. Catholic churches in Muntinlupa fall under the jurisdiction of the Diocese of Parañaque, with about 11 parishes within Muntinlupa.

Other religions in Muntinlupa include various Protestant denominations, Iglesia ni Cristo, Members Church of God International, The Church of Jesus Christ of Latter-day Saints, Hinduism, Buddhism and Islam.

Economy

Barangay Alabang, part of the second district of Muntinlupa, has undergone tremendous growth mainly due to a development boom in the late 1990s. The development of two large-scale commercial real estate projects namely; the Filinvest Corporate City and Ayala Land's Madrigal Business Park, changed the landscape of Muntinlupa from what was once vast fields of cow pasture in the late 1980s, into a supercity that houses new residential, business, industrial and commercial establishments.

The Muntinlupa "Business One-Stop-Shop" is recognized in the 2014 World Cities Summit in Singapore in its effectiveness in reducing the number of steps in acquiring a Business Permit.

Industry
Northgate Cyberzone is the information technology park within Filinvest Corporate City in Alabang. The , PEZA registered IT zone is designed, mastered-planned and built around the needs of technology-based companies engaged in Business Process Outsourcing (BPO), Knowledge Process Outsourcing (KPO), education, learning and firm, software design and multimedia, call centers, e-commerce, banking and financial services, as well as other IT support businesses and the like. It is home to Capital One Philippines Support Services Corp., Convergys Philippines Corp, HSBC Electronic Data Processing (Philippines), Inc., Genpact, Verizon Business and many more.

Kawasaki Motors Philippines Corporation is in charge of production and distribution of Kawasaki Motors in the Philippines. KMPC, having been in the country for over 40 years, is hailed today as one of the top manufacturers in the Philippine motorcycle industry. Amkor Technology is a semiconductor product packaging and test services provider that established its first Philippine plant in Cupang. Pepsi-Cola Products Philippines has a plant located in Tunasan. Zuellig Pharma is also within the city.

Commerce
Shopping centers in Muntinlupa include Alabang Town Center and Ayala Malls South Park, both owned by Ayala Malls, Festival Alabang owned and operated by Filinvest Development Corporation, Starmall Alabang (formerly known as Metropolis Star Alabang), SM Center Muntinlupa owned by SM Prime Holdings, Commercenter Alabang, and W.Mall Muntinlupa.

There are multiple car dealerships located in Muntinlupa and most of them are along the Alabang–Zapote Road in Alabang. Ford Motors Alabang has a five-floor facility covering a floor area of nearly  including a 2-floor, 23-vehicle showroom and a 4-floor, and an 80-bay service center. Toyota Alabang also constructed a facility with a showroom, parts warehouse, office & service facilities in a  lot. Audi Alabang, Chevrolet Alabang, Chrysler Alabang, Mitsubishi Motors Alabang, Nissan and Suzuki Alabang are also located within the area, most of which are along the Alabang–Zapote Road. Still in Alabang–Zapote Road but located in barangay Ayala Alabang are Hyundai Alabang, Isuzu Alabang and Honda Alabang.

Government

Local government
Muntinlupa is governed primarily by the city mayor, the vice mayor and the city councilors. The mayor acts as the chief executive of the city, while the city councilors act as its legislative body. The vice mayor, besides taking on mayoral responsibilities in case of a temporary vacancy, acts as the presiding officer of the city legislature. The legislative body is composed of 16 regular members (8 per district) and representatives from the barangay and the youth council.

The Bureau of Corrections has its headquarters in the New Bilibid Prison Reservation in Muntinlupa.

"Most Business Friendly City" on 2001, 2002 & 2006 as awarded by the Philippine Chamber of Commerce and Industry

Muntinlupa is the first city in the Philippines to ban the use of plastic bags and styrofoam for packaging. The Muntinlupa city government encourages to "Bring your own Bag" or "BYOB" when shopping to reduce the use of plastic bags that would otherwise clog the waterways.

ISO Certification on Quality Management System or ISO 9001:2000 has initially been acquired on 2004 and is valid for 3 years. Muntinlupa has re-acquired its ISO Certification on QMS in April 2015, ISO 9001:2008, together with Ospital ng Muntinlupa and Pamantasan ng Lungsod ng Muntinlupa as certified by BRS Rim of the World Operations, California.

City seal 

Designed by Manuel Amorsolo, son of a national artist Fernando Amorsolo, the city seal features the Philippine Eagle, the biggest, the strongest and the highest flying bird of the Philippine Republic, a bird that symbolizes the city's mission to become the Premiere Emerald City of the 21st Century. It is composed of:

 The Philippine Eagle - Symbolizes the City of Muntinlupa soaring into new heights in terms of progress and prosperity; the characteristics properly enlikened to a mother, that is caring, loving and nurturing her children to become good and responsible citizens of the country; and Muntinlupa's hope, vision and dream of becoming a premiere city of the nation.
 Bamboo Surrounding the Seal - Symbolizes the ability of the citizens of Muntinlupa to cope up with the fast changing times; that we can withstand the trials that come our way and stand still and ready to triumph again.
 Lakas, Talino at Buhay - These are words taken from the lyrics of the Muntinlupa March, the city's official anthem. These are values that will guide the city in achieving its goals and visions.
 1917 and 1995 - The year 1917 marks the time when Muntinlupa became an independent town (although it was effective January 1, 1918, by virtue of Executive Order 108) while the year 1995 was the time when Muntinlupa became a city.
 The Philippine Flag - The flag behind the eagle symbolizes the City of Muntinlupa being a part of the Republic of the Philippines and its government.
 The Nine Stars - The nine stars symbolize the nine barangays that comprises the City of Muntinlupa, namely: Tunasan, Poblacion, Putatan, Bayanan, Alabang, Cupang, Buli, Sucat and Ayala Alabang.

City hymn 
Muntinlupa has its official hymn, called "Martsa ng Muntinlupa", composed by Renato Dilig. It was adopted in 1989, during its time as municipality.

List of former chief executives
Municipal Mayors:

City Mayors:
 Ignacio R. Bunye - 1995–1998
 Jaime R. Fresnedi - 1998–2007; 2013–2022
 Aldrin L. San Pedro - 2007–2013
 Rozzano Rufino B. Biazon - 2022–present

Culture

Museum

Museo ng Muntinlupa is a five-story structure which is set to contain items of historical value to the city. The exterior is designed to look like a traditional fishtrap.

Libraries

Muntinlupa City Public Library is located at the recently constructed Plaza Central Building at Muntinlupa Poblacion. Plaza Central was inaugurated on October 6, 2017. It is located at the previous site of the Contessa Building (Old City Hall).

Sports and recreation
Muntinlupa has 10 swimming pools, 14 billiard halls, 11 tennis courts, 8 resorts, 7 country clubs, 9 Dance/Fitness/Slimming Centers, 41 open basketball courts, 59 covered basketball courts and 11 parks & playgrounds. The Muntinlupa Sports Complex is used for a variety of activities such as concerts, conferences, reunions and graduations, the sports complex has 3,500 seating capacity and has two separate multipurpose rooms. The Muntinlupa Aquatic Center also hosts an Olympic-sized swimming pool, the first of its kind in the Philippines. Both the Sports Complex and Aquatic Center are located on a reclaimed area in Barangay Tunasan; it also has an open area which local residents enjoy their morning exercise and leisure time.

Music
Since 2017, the site of Karpos' Wanderland Music and Arts Festival has been hosted annually in Muntinlupa. The location of this venue is in the Filinvest City Events Grounds, situated in the heart of the Alabang district. The event hosts various bands, that range from international to homegrown artists, and live art performances.

Muntinlupa is also home to 19 East, a premier live music venue that features the country's top artists. Gigs usually occur on a daily basis, suggesting that any given day would guarantee customers a lively experience.

Public utilities

Electricity

The sole distributor of electricity in Metro Manila is the Manila Electric Company, also known as Meralco.

The de-commissioned Sucat Thermal Power Plant is located at Sucat.

Water and sewage
Water in Muntinlupa is provided by Maynilad Water Services (also known as Maynilad), which also serves western Metro Manila and some parts of Cavite. It is one of the two concessionaires that provide water to Metro Manila in the Philippines; the other one is Manila Water which serves the eastern Metro Manila.

Telecommunication
Majority of the land-line connection is provided by phone carrier Philippine Long Distance Telephone Company. Mobile telecommunication services are mostly provided by Globe Telecom, Smart Communications, and Dito Telecommunity.

Transportation
Muntinlupa can be accessed through private vehicles, buses, jeepneys, taxis, tricycles, and UV Express. Electric vehicles by both private and public sectors operate within the borders of the city.

Public utility vehicles

City buses with routes plying EDSA to Quezon City, Navotas, or Valenzuela serve the two terminals at Alabang, the Alabang Integrated Bus Terminal at Starmall Alabang, and South Station at Filinvest City. Provincial buses to Batangas City, Lucena, Quezon, and Bicol Region also depart from Alabang.

Jeepneys routes to General Mariano Alvarez, Calamba, and Pasay, including express services, also use the terminals at Alabang.

Tricycles and pedicabs serve the interior of barangays and residential areas.

"360 Eco-loop" is Filinvest City's fully integrated electric-powered public transport system operated by Filinvest as the main mode of transportation around Filinvest City. "electric-Jeepney Ride for Free," launched by the City Government of Muntinlupa on March 30, 2015, is composed of an initial fleet of 10 e-jeepneys produced in the Philippines.

Rail
Philippine National Railways has 3 stations in the city: Sucat, Alabang, and Muntinlupa (Barangay Poblacion) stations. There used to be a 4th and 5th stations in Barangay Tunasan and Barangay Buli; however, both were discontinued and demolished in 2009. Alabang station is the terminus of the Metro Commuter services; so, only the Provincial Commuter services that goes to Calamba stops in the Muntinlupa station which is currently two northbound trips in the morning and two southbound trips in the evening. Service southward to Alabang has resumed, but limited to Mamatid station in Cabuyao, Laguna.

Roads

Muntinlupa is served by expressways, national highways, and arterial roads, usually crowded.

National highways serving the city include Maharlika Highway, which parallels the South Luzon Expressway and functions as the city's main artery and Alabang-Zapote Road, formerly known as "Real Street". Daang Hari Road, opened in 2003, lies on the boundary with Las Piñas near Ayala Alabang, Katarungan Village, and New Bilibid Prisons.

Expressways passing through Muntinlupa include South Luzon Expressway, a part of the Pan-Philippine Highway (AH26) Luzon route, the elevated 
Skyway, and the Muntinlupa–Cavite Expressway. A proposed expressway, Laguna Lakeshore Expressway Dike, is being planned to run along Laguna de Bay from Taguig in Metro Manila to Calamba and Los Baños in Laguna.

Arterial roads serve as the main route from the national roads to the barangays and its residential and commercial areas. Few examples of those roads include Commerce Avenue between Alabang and Ayala Alabang, Corporate Avenue in Filinvest City, Alabang, E. Rodriguez Sr. Avenue in Poblacion, E. Rodriguez Jr. Avenue in Tunasan, San Guillermo Street in Putatan, and Manuel L. Quezon Avenue from Alabang to Sucat and to the Taguig city boundary. The arterial roads are usually narrow, crowded with tricycles, pedestrians, and parked vehicles, and has few or no sidewalks, while a few, like Commerce Avenue, which has wide divided roads with traffic lights and sidewalks.

Healthcare

Muntinlupa has 18 health centers, 1 public hospital, and 8 private hospitals. The sole public hospital of the city is the Ospital ng Muntinlupa while the Asian Hospital and Medical Center and the Medical Center Muntinlupa are among the city's private hospital. The Food and Drug Administration, tasked to ensure the health and safety of food and drugs, has its headquarters located at Alabang, Muntinlupa. The Research Institute for Tropical Medicine a research facility dedicated to infectious and tropical diseases in the Philippines is also based in Muntinlupa.

Education
 Schools providing public education in Muntinlupa is administered by Division of City Schools – Muntinlupa, a local division of the Department of Education.

Muntinlupa has 89 child development centers (including day care centers, nursery schools and kindergarten schools), 20 public elementary schools, 8 public high schools, 1 public tertiary school, 1 public vocational/technical school, 88 private schools, 10 private tertiary schools and 9 private vocational/technical schools. The "Iskolar ng Bayan" program has been able to give financial assistance to 3,567 students with an allocated budget of thirteen million pesos. The city search for the Ten Muntinlupa Outstanding Students (MOST) is conducted annually to give recognition and honor to talented and academically excellent students in all public and private high schools of Muntinlupa.

Public secondary schools
 Muntinlupa National High School is a public high school located at Poblacion, Muntinlupa. MNHS also has a special curriculum, the Science Technology and Engineering or STE (formerly ESEP), that prepares students for careers in Science and Technology, Math, and Communication Arts.
 Muntinlupa Science High School or MunSci, is a special public high school in the City of Muntinlupa, Philippines that provides a technical and science curriculum that aims to prepare students for careers in Science and Technology, Math, and Communication Arts. Nihongo and French classes are also offered to students. Classes are taught by teachers from the Japanese and French embassies.
 Pedro E. Diaz High School, formerly Annex of Fort Bonifacio College (FBC), is a public high school located at UP Side Subd., Alabang, Muntinlupa.
 Muntinlupa Business High School, formerly known as Pedro E. Diaz High School Annex, is located at Espeleta St., Buli, Muntinlupa. The school makes education more accessible to students residing at Barangay Buli, Cupang and Sucat. MBHS offers a curriculum focused on preparing its graduates into vocational and collegiate degree.
 Tunasan National High School, also known as Muntinlupa National High School-Tunasan Annex, is the newest public high school, established in 2012 which caters Technical Vocational Courses, TVL Maritime and Humanities and Social Sciences under Academic Track and Grades 7-10 of K-12 curriculum.

Public tertiary school
 Pamantasan ng Lungsod ng Muntinlupa is a local university in the city that started as a dream of former Mayor Ignacio Bunye who viewed education as potent tool for transforming society for the better. Upon his assumption of office in 1986, he included the objective of organizing and establishing an institution of higher learning in the Ten Point Agenda of his administration. Former Dean Enrico Vivar led the movement to convert the Muntinlupa Polytechnic College into a local university. Atty. Raul R. Corro, then Councilor and Chairman of the Committee on Education, sponsored City Ordinance No. 03-089 converting the Muntinlupa Polytechnic College to a Pamantasan ng Lungsod ng Muntinlupa (PLMun) in March 2003 during the 67th session. The Pamantasan ng Lungsod ng Muntinlupa is now ISO 9001:2008 CERTIFIED by the BRS Rim of the World Operations in California, USA. PLMun was awarded its Certification on April 27, 2015, at the City Hall Quadrangle of the City Government of Muntinlupa.
 Colegio De Muntinlupa is a local government school and CHED-recognized free higher education institution, Colegio de Muntinlupa (CDM) was established to help fill the gap in the science and technology sector of the Philippines. It is Situated in Posadas Avenue in Barangay Sucat and was founded in 2018 with Mayor Jaime Fresnedi overseeing its founding. With its complete and brand-new facilities that meet international standards and high-caliber professors, CDM aims to produce competent nation builders who will be the drivers of sustainable development in the country. Currently, CDM offers five (5) Engineering programs, namely Civil Engineering, Computer Engineering, Electrical Engineering, Electronics Engineering, and Mechanical Engineering. It is also set to offer 5 new programs namely Architecture, Construction Engineering and Management, Environmental Engineering, Industrial Engineering, and Robotics Engineering this coming Academic year 2022-2023. The college is also expecting their first batch of Graduates this 2022.

Technical and vocational training
 Muntinlupa City Technical Institute MCTI offers technical vocational-training of TESDA Accredited Courses. Courses offered in MCTI are Automotive Servicing NC II, Building Wiring Installation NC II, Dressmaking NC II, Food & Beverage Services NC II and Massage Therapy NC II.

Alternative learning system
 ALS Center Bayanan, formerly Bayanan Elementary School Unit I, conducts Alternative Learning System classes during Saturdays and uses modules that students can answer at home. This program will help them finish secondary education to make them eligible to take courses offered by TESDA or be a college graduate. They will be given certificates by the Department of Education (DepEd) once they finish the program in five months. The project is being implemented by the local DepEd office in coordination with the city government.
 NBP Alternative Learning System is 10-month course offered by the Department of Education (DepEd). Convicts are given a chance to overcome illiteracy or acquire livelihood skills behind bars. This program is made possible by the coordination of Bureau of Corrections with the Department of Education.

Notable personalities

Architecture:
 Francisco Mañosa - National Artist of the Philippines for Architecture

Entertainment personalities:

 Janina Manipol - commercial model, entrepreneur, filmmaker, and fashion photographer
 Vic Sotto - Actor and TV host of Eat Bulaga
 Pauleen Luna - Actress
 Charlene Gonzales - Actress, Beauty Queen
 Jodi Sta. Maria - Actress of ABS-CBN
 Lougee Basabas - Lead Singer of Mojofly
 Boboy Garovillo - Singer
 Champ Lui Pio - Vocalist of HALE Band
 Fernando Poe Jr. - Action film icon, National Artist
 Lea Salonga - Singer
 Ronnie Ricketts - Action film icon
 Mariz Ricketts - A multi-talented artist. Wife of Ronnie Ricketts
 Dale Baldillo - Child Actor & Socialite-Phlantrophist 
 Matteo Guidicelli - Actor, Singer and TV Host
 Sarah Geronimo - Singer, Actress
 Ya Chang - Japanese/Filipino Accent 
 Karel Marquez - Actress & Model
 Niño Muhlach - Former Child Actor & Director
 Aga Muhlach - Actor of ABS-CBN
 Alonzo Muhlach - Child Actor
 Paolo Abrera - TV Host, Triathlete
 Marlo Mortel - Actor
 Sarita Pérez de Tagle - Actress
 Derek Ramsay - Actor
 Janos Delacruz - Painter
 Ernie Baron - former weather broadcaster and inventor of Baron Super Antenna
 Mark Maglasang - previously known as "Bosx1ne" and now known as "Honcho", he is a rapper, founder, and leader of Ex Battalion 
Archie dela Cruz - also known as "Flow-G", rapper and Ex Battalion member
 JRoa - former member of Ex Battalion, singer-songwriter
 John Marren Mangabang - also known as "Emcee Rhenn", rapper and Ex Battalion member
 Allan Paule - actor

Pageants:

 Bea Santiago - Beauty Queen
 Gwennaelle Ruais - Miss Philippines Fire 2010
 Gwen Ruais - Miss World Philippines 2011, Miss World 2011 1st runner-up

Sports people:

 Michael Christian Martinez - Figure Skater
 Tim Cone - PBA Coach
 Arwind Santos - PBA Player
 Scottie Thompson - PBA Player
 Troy Rosario - PBA Player
 Kevin Racal - PBA Player
 Ebrahim Enguio Lopez - ABL Player
 Jenny Guerrero - Swimmer
 Padim Israel - former Philippine Basketball Association player who plays at Purefoods Hotdogs.
 Rey Evangelista - former Purefoods player
 Robert Jaworski - PBA Legend
 Reynel Hugnatan - PBA Player
 Dennis Miranda - PBA player and currently assistant coach of FEU Tamaraws
 Gabby Espinas - PBA player
 Roi Sumang - PBA Player
 Dyan Castillejo - Sports analyst

Politicians:

 Ruffy Biazon - former congressman, former customs chief, and incumbent mayor of the city
 Rodolfo Biazon - former senator and former congressman of the city
 Ignacio Bunye - former mayor of the city and press secretary
 Fidel Ramos - former president
 Ming Ramos - former first lady

Sister cities

International

National

See also

Notes

References

External links

 
 [ Philippine Standard Geographic Code]
 

 
Cities in Metro Manila
Populated places established in 1869
1869 establishments in the Philippines
Populated places on Laguna de Bay
Highly urbanized cities in the Philippines